

Features overview

Desktop processors

Duron "Spitfire" (Model 3, 180 nm)
 All models support: MMX, Enhanced 3DNow!

Duron "Morgan" (Model 7, 180 nm)
 All models support: MMX, SSE, Enhanced 3DNow!

Duron "Applebred" (Model 8, 130 nm)
 All models support: MMX, Extended MMX, SSE, 3DNow!, Enhanced 3DNow!

Mobile processors

Mobile Duron "Spitfire" (Model 3, 180 nm)
 All models support: MMX, Enhanced 3DNow!

Mobile Duron "Camaro" (Model 7, 180 nm)
 All models support: MMX, SSE, Enhanced 3DNow!

Notes

See also
 Duron
 List of AMD microprocessors
 Table of AMD processors

References

External links
 https://www.amd.com/us-en/Processors/TechnicalResources/0%2c%2c30_182_739_2979,00.html
 https://web.archive.org/web/19991013102053/http://sandpile.org/impl/k7.htm
 https://web.archive.org/web/20040603220327/http://www.geek.com/procspec/procspec.htm
 https://web.archive.org/web/20030602183609/http://users.erols.com/chare/elec.htm

Duron
Lists of microprocessors